Venn Ottery, historically also spelt Fen Ottery, is a small village in East Devon, England. It lies 1 mile north of the larger village of Newton Poppleford. In 1931 the parish had a population of 66. 

Venn Ottery was an ancient parish.  St Gregory's Church has a 15th-century tower, and is a Grade II* listed building. Venn Ottery became a civil parish in 1866, but in 1935 the parish was abolished and added to the parish of Harpford. In 1968 the parish was renamed Newton Poppleford and Harpford.

Venn Ottery Common, west of the village, is a nature reserve owned by the Devon Wildlife Trust. It is part of the East Devon Pebblebed Heaths, a nationally important lowland heath area and site of special scientific interest.

References

External links

Villages in Devon
Former civil parishes in Devon
East Devon District